USAir Flight 1016 was a regularly scheduled flight in the southeastern United States, between Columbia, South Carolina, and Charlotte, North Carolina. On July 2, 1994, the flight encountered heavy thunderstorms and microburst-induced windshear while attempting to land, and crashed into heavy trees and a private residence near the  The crash and ensuing fire caused 37 fatalities and seriously injured

Flight

History of the flight
On Saturday, July 2, 1994, the McDonnell Douglas DC-9, registered N954VJ, that was flying as USAir Flight 1016 departed Columbia Metropolitan Airport at 18:15 EDT for the 35-minute flight to Charlotte/Douglas International Airport. The crew consisted of Captain Michael Greenlee (38), First Officer James Phillip "Phil" Hayes (41), and three flight attendants. There were 52 passengers (including two infants) on board.
The flight was uneventful until the approach to Charlotte, where several severe thunderstorms were in the vicinity of the airport. At 18:38, Flight 1016 was cleared by Charlotte approach control for an instrument landing system (ILS) approach to Runway 18R (now 18C), with Hayes at the controls in heavy rain. The flight switched over to the local tower controller that was handling landings for 18R, and at 18:39, the  controller gave the crew clearance to land. Captain Greenlee asked the controller for a weather report from the plane ahead of Flight 1016, a Fokker 100 that had just landed on 18R. The tower told Flight 1016 that the Fokker pilot reported "smooth sailing." In post-crash interviews, passengers and flight attendants told the NTSB that the flight seemed normal until the plane entered the heavy rain on final approach.

At 18:40, a tower controller issued a windshear warning to all aircraft, but on a different radio frequency than that used by Flight 1016. About a minute later, as Flight 1016 was on final approach, the captain, realizing that his aircraft was in a serious predicament, attempted to abort the landing by instructing the first officer to "take it around, go to the right." The plane struggled to climb in the severe weather conditions, veered to the right and rapidly descended. The flight crew desperately tried to control the airplane as it plummeted toward the ground. It was later determined that the windshear alert system did not alert the crew with a red indicator and aural warning because of a software discrepancy that lowered the sensitivity while the flaps were in transit from 40 to 15 degrees during the go-around procedure. A Honeywell engineer stated that the pilots should have received a warning eight to nine seconds before impact.

Crash

It then crashed through the airport fence and impacted several trees, breaking apart while skidding down a residential street that was on the airport boundary. The plane broke into four major sections, and the front , including the cockpit and the unoccupied first class passenger cabin, came to rest in the middle of Wallace Neel Road. The rear section of the fuselage, including the tail and the rear-mounted engines, came to rest in the carport of a house.

Of the 52 passengers, 37 died from blunt force trauma, burns from the fire or carbon monoxide inhalation. An additional 14 passengers suffered serious injuries, and one had minor injuries. Of the five crew members, both pilots suffered minor injuries, two flight attendants were seriously injured and the remaining flight attendant sustained minor injuries. No one on the ground was injured.

The airport's previous, and still (2022) deadliest, major incident occurred on September 11, 1974, when Eastern Air Lines Flight 212, also a DC-9, crashed during approach, killing 72.

Investigation and response
The NTSB immediately dispatched an investigation team, which recovered the CVR and FDR from the plane's wreckage. After a lengthy investigation, the NTSB concluded that a microburst generated by the thunderstorm over the airport at the time of the crash was the probable cause of the accident. The NTSB listed these contributing factors:

The flight crew's decision to continue an approach to an area where a microburst was likely.
The failure of the flight crew to recognize wind shear quickly (exacerbated by an error in the wind shear alert software; the wind shear alert system should have warned them about 8–9 seconds prior to impact)
The failure of the flight crew to establish proper pitch and engine power that would have brought them out of the wind shear
The lack of timely weather information by air traffic control to the crew of Flight 1016

In the media
The Flight 1016 crash is discussed in a Mayday (Air Disasters in the U.S.) television series episode, "Racing the Storm" (S1E2), about American Airlines Flight 1420, which also crashed while landing in inclement weather. The accident was later featured in Mayday episode "Storming Out" (S17E6). Flight 1016 was also the subject of an episode of The Unexplained, a Biography Channel series.

See also

USAir Flight 427 - another fatal accident involving USAir that happened two months later
Delta Air Lines Flight 191
Martinair Flight 495
Pan Am Flight 759
Pan Am Flight 806
American Airlines Flight 1420
United Nations Flight 834
1956 Kano Airport BOAC Argonaut crash
1950 Air France multiple Douglas DC-4 accidents
Airborne wind shear detection and alert system
Aeroméxico Connect Flight 2431
Low level windshear alert system

Notes

References
11. Air Disasters, Malcolm MacPherson, Collins, London, 2008, Paperback.

External links
Sudden Impact — A Flight Attendant's Story of Courage and Survival
Interview with Richard DeMary, flight attendant aboard flight 1016 (Archive)
Photo of N954VJ, prior to the crash

NTSB investigation docket

Airliner accidents and incidents in North Carolina
Airliner accidents and incidents caused by microbursts
1016
Disasters in North Carolina
Accidents and incidents involving the McDonnell Douglas DC-9
History of Charlotte, North Carolina
Aviation accidents and incidents in the United States in 1994
1994 in North Carolina
1994 meteorology
July 1994 events in the United States
Charlotte Douglas International Airport
Airliner accidents and incidents caused by pilot error